The Christadelphian Meal-a-Day Fund (CMaD) is an international family of charities founded by the Christadelphians. Its stated intent is, as a practical witness to the Christadelphian faith, 'to share the blessings we receive from God to help those who are in real need in the less developed parts of the world'. It seeks 'to facilitate personal and community dignity through sustainable, ‘down to earth’ local projects' which:

 help to relieve the effects of hunger, disease, disability, destitution and homelessness
 promote agriculture, clean water, basic healthcare and education
 encourage sharing, learning and service to others and community development.

The charity focuses primarily on developing countries.

Some major projects

Christadelphian School for Blind and Handicapped, Mbengwi, Cameroon: The school can admit up to 40 blind or disabled pupils and provides training in skills that help them to become self-supporting and to take up their place in society. 
The Meal-a-Day Academy, Monrovia, Liberia: The academy provides primary level education for the least well-off children in Monrovia. There are close ties between the school, the local church and the community. Almost 500 orphaned or abandoned children are enrolled at the school, most of them living in the community with ‘guardians’, usually neighbours or distant relatives. There are ten trained teachers. As well as educating the children the academy provides a hot lunch each day.
The Nalondo School for Physically Handicapped Children, Western Province, Kenya was established in 1998 with 48 students. Classrooms, dormitories, kitchens and administration buildings were all built over the first few years. A water supply was provided and the school has some agricultural and animal projects to improve the children’s diet and self-sufficiency. The school is recognised as a centre of excellence in the region. The school has now expanded its programme from the original four levels to cover the full eight levels of Kenyan primary education. The development involved the construction of four new classrooms, two dormitories, two latrines and washing block, three water tanks and a teacher’s house. The total number of students supported by CMaD has risen to 96.
The Timboni Tiva Children‘s Home: Established in 1996 in an arid part of Kenya, east of Nairobi, the home cares for over 100 orphaned children. There is also a small nurse-led clinic on site which provides medical care to the nearby communities and provides out-reach health education.

Other projects
Aside from the major, long term projects, the fund has made significant one-off donations to other causes, e.g., Tree Aid (which plants trees in Africa 'to reduce poverty and protect the environment'), Village Water (providing wells and a programme of hygiene education to rural Zambian villages), WhizzKids United (an Africaid-run HIV/AIDS education programme using football to teach lessons about health) and others.

History
The Christadelphian Meal-a-Day fund was founded in Tamworth, UK in 1976. The name was inspired by a speech of Henry Kissinger's, in which he said everyone on earth should have at least one meal a day.

In 1999, representatives also started working in Australia to raise awareness and funding for projects in Nepal, Thailand, India, the Autonomous Region of Bougainville and Zambia. A revised, three-region structure was introduced in 2007, with aid for Europe, the Middle East and Africa being managed by the UK committee, aid for Asia-Pacific managed by an Australian committee, and that for North and Latin America and the Caribbean by a committee based in the United States and Canada.

Fundraising
CMaD has a number fundraising channels, including donations from individuals, group donations from church collections, legacies, gift aid, sponsorship, and the sale of various items, such as greeting cards, tea towels and t-shirts. In recent years, in the region of £750,000 per annum has been raised by CMaD UK, around 60% of which is currently used on long term projects that rely largely, or solely, on CMaD funding.

References

External links
 Christadelphian Meal-a-Day Fund UK
 Christadelphian Christadelphian Meal-a-Day Fund Asia-Pacific
 Christadelphian Meal-a-Day Fund of the Americas

Development charities based in Australia
Religious charities based in the United States
Organizations established in 1976
Christadelphian organizations
International charities
Christian charities based in the United Kingdom